The 7th Metro Manila Film Festival was held in 1981. 

Bancom Audiovision's Kisapmata, a movie about a deranged retired policeman, won ten of the thirteen awards in the 1981 Metro Manila Film Festival including the Best Picture, Best Director for Mike de Leon, and Best Actor for Vic Silayan and among others. Vilma Santos was named Best Actress for her role in Sining Silangan's Karma.

FPJ Productions' Pagbabalik ng Panday was the top grosser of the festival.

Entries

Winners and nominees

Awards
Winners are listed first and highlighted in boldface.

Multiple awards

References

External links
 

Metro Manila Film Festival
MMFF
MMFF